Saint Acisclus (also Ascylus, Ocysellus;) (died 304) was a martyr of Córdoba, in Hispania (the Iberian Peninsula, i.e., modern Portugal and Spain).  His life is mentioned by Eulogius of Cordoba.  He suffered martyrdom during the Diocletianic Persecution along with his sister Victoria.  Their feast day is 17 November.  There is doubt about the historical veracity of Victoria's existence, but both martyrs were honored in Mozarabic liturgical rites.

After they were arrested, Acisclus and Victoria were tortured.  According to tradition, Victoria was killed by arrows and Acisclus was beheaded.

One tenth century passio relates that the Roman prefect of Córdoba, Dion, an "iniquitous persecutor of Christians," had Acisclus and Victoria cast into a fiery furnace.  However, when he heard Acisclus and Victoria sing songs of joy from within the furnace, Dion had them bound to stones and cast into the Guadalquivir.  They were soon floating unharmed on the river's surface.  He then suspended them over a fire.  The fire, however, raged out of control and killed hundreds of pagans.  The two saints then submitted to martyrdom, having proved their point and demonstrated their faith.

Their home was turned into a church.  During the ninth century, some of the Martyrs of Córdoba were associated with this church, including Perfectus, a priest there.

Veneration

Acisclus, along with his sister Victoria, are patron saints of Córdoba, and their cult was venerated throughout Hispania and southern France, especially in Provence.  There was a minor church dedicated to Saint Acisclus on the slopes of Montserrat.

Iconography
Acisclus and Victoria are represented in art as a young man and woman crowned with roses.

References

Sources
Saint of the Day: Acisclus
Martyrdom without Miracles, Christian Martyrs in Muslim Hispania
"Patronage and Piety: Montserrat and the Royal House of Medieval Catalonia-Aragon" Detailed history of the abbey (PDF)
"Passio SS. Martyrum Aciscli & Victoriae" (in Latin, in xps format), in Enrique Florez, España Sagrada (Madrid: Antonio Marin, 1753), X, 485–491.

External links

 "Acislus and Victoria" at the Christian Iconography website
 CatholicSaints
 Vatican.va

Saints from Hispania
304 deaths
4th-century Christian martyrs
4th-century Romans
Year of birth unknown
Christians martyred during the reign of Diocletian